The 1884 Richmond Virginians joined the American Association during the season after the Washington Statesmen dropped out. They  finished with a 12–30 record, 10th place in the American Association. This was the only season the team was in operation.

Regular season

Season standings

Record vs. opponents

Opening Day lineup

Roster

Player stats

Batting

Starters by position 
Note: Pos = Position; G = Games played; AB = At bats; H = Hits; Avg. = Batting average; HR = Home runs

Other batters 
Note: G = Games played; AB = At bats; H = Hits; Avg. = Batting average; HR = Home runs

Pitching

Starting pitchers 
Note: G = Games pitched; IP = Innings pitched; W = Wins; L = Losses; ERA = Earned run average; SO = Strikeouts

'

References 
 1884 Richmond Virginians team page at Baseball Reference

Richmond Virginians